Anthony John Walton (born 1962) is a former New Zealand political party president. He was leader of the Future New Zealand party, having previously been a prominent member of Future New Zealand's predecessor, the Christian Democrat Party. Before becoming president, Walton had been on the Christian Democrats' National Council since the party was launched in 1995. Walton championed Future New Zealand's merger with United New Zealand, creating the modern United Future New Zealand party in 2000. He was expected to take second place on United Future's party list but elected instead to pursue other career options. Walton is currently chief minister at the Olive Tree Church in Wellington. He is also associated with Zeal, an evangelical Christian youth enterprise and entertainment venue in that city. He has written on the subject of Christian apologetics and church formation. In 2001, he wrote a Christian apologetic's work (see below).

Bibliography
Anthony Walton: Think Outside the Box: Philosophy, Logic and The World Next Door: Wellington: Global Tribe: 2001:

References

1962 births
Living people
New Zealand evangelical leaders
Leaders of political parties in New Zealand
Christian Democrat Party (New Zealand) politicians
Unsuccessful candidates in the 1999 New Zealand general election